Helmut Ashley or Helmuth Ashley (17 September 1919 – 2 July 2021) was an Austrian cinematographer, television and film director.

Ashley turned 100 in September 2019 and died in Munich in July 2021, at the age of 101.

Selected filmography
Film
 Duel with Death (directed by Paul May, 1949)
  White Shadows (directed by Helmut Käutner, 1951)
 All Clues Lead to Berlin (directed by František Čáp, 1952)
 Captive Soul (directed by Hans Wolff, 1952)
 Adventure in Vienna (directed by Emil-Edwin Reinert, 1952)
 Stolen Identity (directed by Gunther von Fritsch, 1953)
 Must We Get Divorced? (directed by Hans Schweikart, 1953)
 Confession Under Four Eyes (1954)
 You Can No Longer Remain Silent (directed by Robert A. Stemmle, 1955)
 Alibi (1955)
 Stopover in Orly (1955)
 Regine (directed by Harald Braun, 1956)
 Nina (1956)
 Der Stern von Afrika (directed by Alfred Weidenmann, 1957)
 Das schwarze Schaf (1960)
 My Schoolfriend (1960)
  (1961)
 The Puzzle of the Red Orchid (1962)
 Mystery of the Red Jungle (1964)
 Die Rechnung – eiskalt serviert (1966)
  (1984)

Television
 Das Kriminalmuseum (1963–1968, TV series, 13 episodes)
 Oberst Wennerström (1965)
 Das Millionending (1966)
 Kidnap – Die Entführung des Lindbergh-Babys (1968)
 Kim Philby war der dritte Mann (1969)
 Der Portland-Ring (1970)
 Die Münchner Räterepublik (1971)
  (1971)
 Ferdinand Lassalle (1972)
 Der Kommissar (1974–1975, TV series, 4 episodes)
 Derrick (1975–1997, TV series, 46 episodes)
 Notarztwagen 7 (1976–1977, TV series, 13 episodes)
 The Old Fox (1978–2005, TV series, 55 episodes)

References

External links
 

1919 births
2021 deaths
Austrian centenarians 
Austrian cinematographers
Austrian film directors
Austrian people of English descent
Austrian television directors
Mass media people from Vienna
Men centenarians
Film directors from Vienna